The 6th BRDC International Trophy meeting was held on 15 May 1954 at the Silverstone Circuit, Northamptonshire. The race was run to Formula One regulations, and was held over two heats of 15 laps each, followed by a final race of 35 laps. Argentinian driver José Froilán González, driving a Ferrari 625, set fastest qualifying lap, won his qualifying heat (in a Ferrari 553) and the final, and also set fastest lap.

Results

Final – 35 Laps

Heats – 15 Laps

References

BRDC International Trophy
BRDC International Trophy
BRDC International Trophy